Eupithecia subflavolineata is a moth in the family Geometridae. It is found in Algeria.

References

Moths described in 1938
subflavolineata
Moths of Africa